The Hyanide is a hybrid motorbike vehicle designed and created by German designers Tilmann Schlootz and Oliver Keller. The motorbike is a combination of dirt bike-snowmobile-four-wheel vehicle concepts which was first showcased at the 2006 Michelin Challenge Design competition. It can move through deep mud, sand and snow terrains via a continuous track. Currently, only a prototype exists as a one-fifth scale model.

Specifications 
The Hyanide has a capacity of about two persons. Its engine is composed of a 60hp 500cc liquid-cooled single-cylinder. The dimensions for the motorbike vehicle is according: 40 (h) x 36 (w) x 90 (l) in. Its weight is estimated to be about 450 to 650 lbs. Also, its top speed is as well estimated to be 75 to 85 mph.

Production 
According to the Hyanide's designers, Tilmann Schlootz and Oliver Keller, there are no current plans to develop and manufacture a production version for the market.

See also 
 Continuous track
 Kégresse track

References

Vehicle technology
Concept motorcycles